Starer is a Jewish surname.

Notable people 
 Robert Starer (born 1924), American composer.
 Jacqueline Starer (born 1940), French Author.

References

Jewish surnames
Kohenitic surnames
Yiddish-language surnames